Qeshlaq-e Seyf Khanlu-ye Do (also Romanized as Qeshlāq-e Seyf Khānlū-ye Do) is a village in Aslan Duz Rural District, Aslan Duz District, Parsabad County, Ardabil Province, Iran. At the 2006 census, its population was 30, in 7 families.

References 

Towns and villages in Parsabad County